Sher Azam Khan is a Pakistani politician who had been a member of the Provincial Assembly of Khyber Pakhtunkhwa from March 2008 to March 2013 and from August 2018 to January 2023.

Political career

He was elected to the Provincial Assembly of Khyber Pakhtunkhwa as a candidate of Pakistan Peoples Party from Constituency PK-87 (Bannu-I) in 2018 Pakistani general election.

References

External links
Sher Azam Khan | KP Assembly

Living people
1944 births